Niraj J. Antani (born February 26, 1991) is an American Republican Party politician who currently serves as a state senator representing the 6th District in the Ohio State Senate. He served three terms as Representative for the 42nd district of the Ohio House of Representatives,. He is a member of the Republican Party. His district, the 6th, is composed of northern, eastern, and southern Montgomery County.

Early life and education
Antani was born and raised in Miami Township. He currently lives in Miamisburg, Ohio.

Antani attended Miamisburg City Schools and graduated from Miamisburg High School in 2009. He went on to Ohio State University and earned his bachelor's degree in political science. After that, he briefly attended the University of Dayton Law School before leaving to run for State Representative.

Career 
When Representative Terry Blair died after winning the 2014 primary election for a fourth term, Antani was chosen by the Montgomery County Republican party to replace Blair on the ballot. It was a difficult win for Antani, who was at the time a political outsider, "It took four rounds for Niraj Antani of Miami Twp. to gain a majority of votes from the district’s GOP precinct captains." However, Antani won the general election 64.5% to 35.5% over Democrat Patrick Merris at the age of 23. Antani was sworn in to the Ohio House of Representatives to complete the remainder of Blair's term on December 2, 2014.

In 2019, Antani co-sponsored legislation that would ban abortion in Ohio and criminalize what they called "abortion murder". Doctors who performed abortions in cases of ectopic pregnancy and other life-threatening conditions would be exempt from prosecution only if they "[took] all possible steps to preserve the life of the unborn child, while preserving the life of the woman. Such steps include, if applicable, attempting to reimplant an ectopic pregnancy into the woman's uterus". Reimplantation of an ectopic pregnancy is not a recognized or medically feasible procedure.

Committee assignments 
During the 134th General Assembly, Antani was assigned to the following Ohio Senate committees:

 (Vice Chair of) Health Committee
 Financial Institutions & Technology Committee
 Judiciary Committee
 Transportation Committee

Electoral history

Controversies 
On March 14, 2018, Antani made headlines by appearing to suggest that students who were over the age of 18 should be allowed to bring rifles to school in their cars. The following day, after substantial press, Niraj backtracked and said that he did a poor job of stating his position.

On December 2, 2018, it was reported that along with many other sitting members of the Ohio General Assembly, Niraj Antani's role in the creation of a letter with Jeff Jacobson, a lending industry lobbyist, intending to weaken a sweeping payday lending bill HB123, was under investigation by the US Department of Justice. A subpoena was issued on August 27, 2018, and sent to a federal grand jury on September 12, 2018.[7] Senator Antani was never charged with a crime in relation to this letter.

On July 21, 2020, Larry Householder was arrested in connection with a $60 million bribery scheme.[8] The federal complaint against Householder is allegedly the largest bribery and money laundering scheme in Ohio history.[9] Allegedly, Householder ran a sham organization, Generation Now, that funneled bribery money to more than a dozen campaigns of both parties, that eventually won their races and then elected him Speaker.[9]

Personal life 
In 2015, Niraj was added to Forbes Magazine's list of the top “30 under 30” people in the U.S. for Law & Policy in 2015.

Beginning in 2018, Antani started serving on the national board of the Republican State Leadership Committee's Future Majority Project.

References

External links
 Official site

Republican Party members of the Ohio House of Representatives
Ohio State University College of Arts and Sciences alumni
People from Miamisburg, Ohio
1991 births
Living people
American politicians of Indian descent
21st-century American politicians
Asian-American people in Ohio politics
Republican Party Ohio state senators
Asian conservatism in the United States